This article includes an overview of the major events and trends in Latin music in the 1970s, namely in Ibero-America (including Spain and Portugal). This includes recordings, festivals, award ceremonies, births and deaths of Latin music artists, and the advancement and adjournment of the genre from 1970 to 1979.

Overview
By 1975, music market analysts predicted an 8 to 10% growth of Latin music internationally. This growth also expanded into the United States which led to record labels of promoting Latin artists in the country. According to Billboards Marv Fisher, " international labels are increasingly involved throughout Latin America".

Latin pop

Latin America went through the balada craze with balladeers from both the region and Spain having a huge Latin audience. Artists include José José, Roberto Carlos, Juan Gabriel, and Julio Iglesias. The latter artist would later become the best-selling male Latin artist of all-time.

Regional Mexican

Mariachi music in 1970s, while still popular in the Regional Mexican music field, was named "the last great decade for mariachi music" according to the Los Angeles Times critic Augustin Gurza. The Mexican farmworkers movement since the 1960s led to the popularity corridos which dealt with their impoverished lives. Most notably, norteño group Los Tigres del Norte emerged having performed songs that deal with social commentary. Another emerging genre in the Regional Mexican field was Tejano. Rigo Tovar modernized the Mexican style of cumbia by combining it with rock including utilizing an electric guitar and a synthesizer.

Tropical/salsa

Salsa music was the dominant genre in the tropical field in the 1970s. Fania Records was the prime record label for popularizing and defining salsa music with artists such as Celia Cruz, Rubén Blades, Héctor Lavoe, and Willie Colón. The Colombian vallenato remains popular in the country with artists such as Diomedes Diaz. Likewise, the country's cumbia expanded its popularity outside of country into other Latin American nations including Mexico. Like its Mexican counterpart, the Colombia cumbia saw changes in the genre with the use of a bass guitar, organ, and less emphasis on brass instruments.

Brazilian/Portuguese

Jorge Ben's Fôrça Brutas fusion of Trio Mocotó's groove and Ben's more rockish guitar proved to be a distinctive feature of what critics and musicians later called samba rock. The 1970s also saw the rise of Música popular brasileira, a form of protest songs against the Brazilian military dictatorship. Among the key musicians in the genre was Chico Buarque who was exiled from the country.

1970

Events
March 10-14Cláudya, representing Brazil, wins the second and final Festival Mundial de la Canción Latina with her song "Canção de amor e paz".

Notable singles

Album releases

Los Ángeles Negros: Y Volveré
Freddie Martinez: Te Traigo Estas Flores
Los Unicos: Los Unicos
Willie Colón, Héctor Lavoe and Yomo Toro: Asalto Navideño
Nino Bravo: Nino Bravo
Pedro Miguel Y Sus Maracaibos: Con Sabor A Cuba
Santana: Abraxas 
Jorge Ben: Fôrça Bruta
Os Mutantes: A Divina Comédia ou Ando Meio Desligado
Tim Maia: Tim Maia
João Donato: A Bad Donato

Deaths

Births
April 19Luis Miguel, Mexican pop singer
November 24Julieta Venegas, Mexican alternative singer

1971

Events

Notable singles

Album releases

Joan Manuel Serrat: Mediterráneo
Roberto Carlos: 
Willie Colón: La Gran Fuga
Cheo Feliciano: Cheo
Raphy Leavitt: Payaso
Cornelio Reyna: Cornelio Reyna
El Gran Combo de Puerto Rico: De Punta a Punta
Raphael: Algo Más...
Juan Gabriel: El Alma Joven...
Nelson Ned: Si Las Flores Pudieran Hablar
Ray Barretto: The Message
Raphael: Le Llaman Jesus
Vikki Carr: Que Sea El
Orchestra Harlow: Tribute To Arsenio Rodriguez
: Olvidarte Nunca
Nino Bravo: Nino Bravo
Formula V: Formula V
Ralfi Pagan: With Love / Con Amor
Roberto Carlos:  (1971)
La Sonora Ponceña: Navidad Criolla
Chico Buarque: Construção
Gal Costa: Fa-Tal - Gal A Todo Vapor
Erasmo Carlos: Carlos, Erasmo
Os Mutantes: Jardim Elétrico
Tim Maia: Tim Maia

Deaths

Births
March 9Diego Torres, Argentine pop singer
April 16Selena, American Tejano singer (d. 1995)
April 24Alejandro Fernández, Mexican ranchera and pop singer
June 17Paulina Rubio, Mexican pop singer
July 5Descemer Bueno, Cuban singer-songwriter
July 30Elvis Crespo, Puerto Rican merengue singer
August 26Thalía, Mexican pop singer
November 25Tommy Torres, Argentine pop singer
December 24Ricky Martin, Puerto Rican pop singer
December 31Claudio Bermúdez, Mexican pop singer

1972

Events
November 11Billboard magazine announces a new section on its printed magazines titled "Latin Music Spotlight" (later known as "Latin Notas"), which covers three pages of Latin music-related news
November 24 and Tobias, representing Brazil win the inaugural OTI Festival with their song "Diálogo".
December 9The first Latin albums chart are compiled by Billboard,under the title the Hot Latin LP's, which surveys sales of Latin LP's in selected regions in the United States including Los Angeles, Chicago, Miami, New York, and Texas.

Notable singles

Album releases

Vikki Carr: En Español
Lucha Villa: Puro Norte, Vol. 2
: Que Ironía
Gerardo Reyes: Gerardo Reyes
Victor Yturbe: Condición
Los Diablos: Vol. III
Estela Nuñez: Estela Nuñez Con Mariachi
Cornelio Reyna: Aqui Está Otra Vez el Amo y Señor de la Canción Norteña
Carmela y Rafael: Remite
Los Freddy's: Con Tu Adiós
Malo: Dos
Victor Yturbe: Noches En La Posada Vallarta
Vicente Fernández: ¡Arriba Huentitàn!
Fania All-Stars: Our Latin Thing
Fania All-Stars: Live at the Cheetah, Vol. II
Roberto Sasian: Mariachi con Organo
Los Blue Angels: Espera
Los Baby's: ¿Por Qué?
El Gran Combo de Puerto Rico: Por el Libro
Willie Colón and Héctor Lavoe: El Juicio
Ray Barretto: Que Viva la Música
Rodolfo Aicardi: Sufrir
José Miguel Class: El Ausente
Ramón Ayala: Hits 1972
Augustine Ramirez: El Gusto es Suyo
Yoyito Cabrera: La Carne Lo Mato
Roberto Roena & Su Apollo Sound: Roberto Roena & Su Apollo Sound
Julio Iglesias: Por una mujer
Tito Rodríguez: En Algo Nuevo
Rolando Laserie: El Rey Guapachoso
Nelson Ned: El Pequeño Gigante
Porfi Jiménez: La Machaca
Ismael Rivera: Esto Fue Lo Que Trajo el Barco
Juan Torres: Organo Melodico, Vol. 15
Juan Torres: Organo Melodico, Vol. 16
Los Ángeles Negros:  Vol. 5 : Porque Te Quiero
Juan Gabriel: El Alma Joven II
Yolanda del Río: La Hija de Nadie
Camilo Sesto: 
Sandro de América: Te Espero
Raphael: Volveré a Nacer
Tito Puente: Para Los Rumberos
Andy Harlow: Sorpresa La Flauta
Elio Roca: Contigo Y Aquí
Yayo el Indio: El Nuevo Yayo
Johnny Ventura: En Alas De Quisqueyana
La Lupe: Stop! I'm Free Again
Coke: Coke
Celia Cruz and Tito Puente: Algo Especial Para Recorda
Johnny Ventura: El Pingüino
Cheo Feliciano:  La Voz Sensual De Cheo
Charlie Palmieri:  El Gigante Del Teclado
Virginia Lopez: Volverá el Amor
: Será
Teddy Trinidad: Teddy Trinidad
Norman Ponce: Norman Ponce
Antonio Aguilar: Corridos de Caballos Famosos
Los Camperos: "El Super Mariachi Los Camperos" En La Fonda
Típica 73: Típica 73
Los Solitarios: Nunca Digas
Juan Marcelo: Yo Te Quiero, Nos Queremos
Ismael Miranda with Orchestra Harlow: Oportunidad
Joey Pastrana: Don Pastrana
Los Alegres de Terán: Corridos Famosos Con Los Alegres De Teran
Tata Ramos: Dama Dama
: Indita Mía
Los Socios del Ritmo: Vida Vamos A Platicar
Lucho Barrios: El Trotamundo
Danny Rivera: Danny Rivera/Dos Amantes
El Super Trio: 73
Enrique Cáceres: Una Voz Y Un Romance
Sophy: Yo Soy Mujer y No Soy una Santa
Manny Perez & Los Cachiros: El Chamaco Moderno
Vicente Fernández: Vicente Fernandez
Richie Ray & Bobby Cruz: Jammin' Live
Bobby Valentín: Soy Boricua
Camilo Sesto: 
Sonora Ponceña: Sonora Ponceña
Victor Yturbe: Imágenes
Nino Bravo: Un Beso y una Flor
Nino Bravo: Mi Tierra
René y René: El Mexicano
Anthony Ríos: Anthony Ríos
José Alfredo Jiménez: Gracias
The Royal Jesters: Yo Soy Chicano
Chris Montez and Raza: Let's Dance
Roberto Carlos: Un gato en la oscuridad
Juan Gabriel: El Alma Joven II
Jairo: Jairo
Novos Baianos: Acabou Chorare
Milton Nascimento and Lô Borges: Clube da Esquina
Caetano Veloso: Transa
Gilberto Gil: Expresso 2222
Paulinho da Viola: A Dança da Solidão
Elis Regina: Elis

Deaths

Births
March 4Ivy Queen, Puerto Rican reggaeton singer
March 9Giro, Puerto Rican salsa singer
August 9Juanes, Colombian pop rock singer
December 1Manny Manuel, Puerto Rican merengue singer

1973

Events
November 10, representing Mexico, wins the 2nd Annual OTI Festival with her song "Que Alegre Va María".

Notable singles

Album releases

Tito Rodríguez: 25th Anniversary Performance
Chaparro: El Padrino
La Protesta: On The Right Track
Lissette: Lissette
Los Antiques: Dís Como Hoy
Orquesta El Sabor De Nacho: Amada Amante
Vicente Fernández: Volver, Volver
: Vanidad
Raphy Leavitt: Jibaro Soy...
José Alfredo Jiméndez & Alicia Juárez: Jose Alfredo Y Alicia
Chalo Campos: Elisa
Conjunto Universal: Que Se Sepa
Elio Roca:  Sin Ti, Se Me Escapa La Vida
Los Broncos De Reynosa: Mi Ultima Carta
Estela Nuñez: Iremos De La Mano
Leo Dan: Leo Dan
Antonio Aguilar:  Antonio Aguilar
Los Socios del Ritmo: El Cuchillito
Rey Roig: Otra Vez
Yndio: Sin Tu Amor
Conjunto Africa: Todos Tienen Una Maria
Sunny & The Sunliners: El Internacional
Los Satelites De Fidencio Ayala: Volver Volver
Johnny Pacheco: Canta El Conde Tres De Cafe Y Dos De Azucar
El Gran Combo de Puerto Rico: En Acción
Eddie Palmieri: Sentido
Pellín Rodríguez: Amor Por Ti
Eduardo Zurita: Para Los Enamorados (Vol. 10)
Augustine Ramirez: Te Quiero Cariñito
José Miguel Class:  Su Voz y Sus Canciones Volume 2
Josue: Josue
Latin Breed: The Return of the Latin Breed
Los Cachorros:  El Volumen 3
Joe Cuba Sextet – Doin' It Right = Hecho Y Derecho
Tito Puente and His Concert Orchestra: Tito Puente And His Concert Orchestra
Las Potranquitas Del Norte: Las Potranquitas del Norte
Lissette:  Martes 2 De La Tarde
Julio Iglesias: Soy
Ray Barretto: The Other Road
: Corazón Vagabundo
Alberto Vazquez: Con Mariachi
Ismael Rivera & Sus Cachimbos: Vengo Por La Maceta
Hilda Murillo: Palabras, Parabras
Angelica Maria: Angelica María
Tipica Novel: Se Colo La Novel
Ismael Miranda & Su Orquesta Revelacion: Asi Se Compone Un Son
Los Tremendos Gavilanes: Gavilanes Country
Ramón Ayala: & Los Bravos del Norte: Corazón vagabundo
Vicente Fernández: Toda Una Época
Los Ángeles Negros: Vuelven de Nuevo
Big Lu & Los Muchachos: A Poco No!
Los Tres Ases: 1973
Lucha Villa: Puro Norte Vol. 3
Roberto Torres: El Castigador
Cheo Feliciano: With a Little Help From My Friend
Little Joe & La Familia: Total
El Gran Combo de Puerto Rico: 5
Combo Miami Brass: "Danger" Alto Contenido en Salsa
Freddie Martinez: Es La Onda Chicana
Freddie Martinez: Farolito de Amor
Los Freddy's: Quiero Ser Feliz
Vicentico Valdés: Amor Con Salsa
Willie Colón and Héctor Lavoe: Lo Mato
Tortilla Factory: Tortilla Factory
Yolanda Del Rio: Pertenezco A Ti
Danny Rivera: Danny Rivera/La Distancia
Conjunto Universal: Conjunto Universal
Elio Roca: Por Fin Logré Tener Tu Amor
Lupita D'Alessio: Eres Tu
Los Baby's: Amor Traicionero
Hermanas Huerta: Mejor Matame
Nino Bravo: Y Vol. 5
Charlie Palmieri & Su Orquesta Vuelve El Gigante
Antonio Aguilar: Viva El Norte Con... Antonio Aguilar
Tito Rodríguez: En la Soledad
Roberto Roena & Su Apollo Sound 5
Eddie Palmieri: In Concert Live At The University Of Puerto Rico
Ray Barretto: Indestructible
Johnny Ventura: Salsa
Raphael: Raphaël
Mocedades: Mocedades
Pellín Rodríguez: Quemame los Ojos
Rey Roig: Otra Vez
Juan Torres: Organo Melodico, Vol. 18
: Presagio
Cornelio Reyna: Voz y Temperamento
Angelica Maria: Tonto
Nelson Ned: Vol. 3
Heleno: No Son Palabritas
Bobby Valentín: Rey del Bajo
Joe Bataan: Salsoul
Antonio Aguilar: Puras Buenas...
Tommy Olivencia: Juntos De Nuevo
Tipica 73: Vol. 2
Ismael Rivera & Sus Cachimbos – Traigo De Todo
: Que Alegre Va Maria
Opus: Opus
Nydia Caro: Nydia Caro
Anthony Ríos:  El Sentimental - Vol.3
Augustine Ramire: Es Tierra Chicana
Angelica Maria: ¿A Dónde Va Nuestro Amor? (EP)
Lucha Villa: Mis Canciones Favoritas
Rafael Cortijo & His Time Machine*: Y Su Maquina Del Tiempo
Los Jimaguas: Igualitos y Con Sabor
Orquesta la Suprema: La Suprema
Los Humildes: Amor Eterno
Los Angeles Negros: Los Angeles Negros/A Ti
Conjunto Acapulco Tropical: Conjunto Acapulco Tropical (1973)
Los Unicos: Lo Mas Nuevo
Palito Ortega: Yo Tengo Fe
Paco de Lucia, Fuente y caudal
Camilo Sesto: Camilo Sesto
The Royal Jesters: Their Second Album
Secos & Molhados: Secos & Molhados
Raul Seixas: Krig-ha, Bandolo!
Luiz Melodia: Pérola Negra
João Gilberto: João Gilberto
Paulinho da Viola: Nervos de Aço
Milton Nascimento: Milagre dos Peixes
Nelson Cavaquinho: Nelson Cavaquinho
Antônio Carlos Jobim: Jobim
João Donato: Quem é Quem
Caetano Veloso: Araçá Azul

Deaths
April 16Nino Bravo, Spanish pop singer
November 23José Alfredo Jiménez, Mexican ranchera singer

Births
February 8Fanny Lu, Colombian tropipop singer
July 21Fey, Mexican pop singer
July 31Jerry Rivera, Puerto Rican salsa singer

1974

Events
October 26Nydia Caro, representing Puerto Rico, wins the 3rd Annual OTI Festival with her song "Solo Canto por Cantar".

Notable singles

Album releases

Eddie Palmieri: Sun of Latin Music
Bobby Paunetto: Paunetto's Point
Irakere: Teatro Amadeo Roldán – Recital
Elis Regina and Antônio Carlos Jobim: Elis & Tom
Sunny & The Sunliners: El Preferido
Francisco Avitia: Zacazonapan
Los Diablos: Vol. 4
Luis Garcia: Cerca De Ti
Teddy Trinidad – Rompamos El Contrato
Larry Harlow: Salsa
Willy Chirino: One Man Alone
Johnny Ventura & Su Combo Show La Protesta De Los Feos
Latin Breed: Mas Latin Breed!
Sunny And The Sunliners: El Orgullo de Texas
Amalia Mendoza and El Mariachi Juvenil de Manuel Valle: La Tariacuri
Danny Rivera: Danny Rivera en Concierto
Enrique Lynch Y Su Conjunto – Llegó La Banda
: Rosenda Bernal
Vitín Avilés: Canta Al Amor
Vicente Fernández: Vicente Fernández/Me Caso el Sabado
Justo Betancourt: Sigo Bravo
Blanca Rosa Gil:  Punto Aparte...Y Hacia Adelante!
Wild Wind: Wild Wind
Charytín: Charytin
Ramón Ayala & Los Bravos Del Norte: La Nueva Zenaida - El Amor Que Me Falta
Marco Antonio Muñiz: Te Quiero Pero... Me Arrepiento
Oscar de Fontana: - Te Esperare En La Playa
Los Freddy's: Llegara Tu Final
Estela Nuñez: Tú Sigues Siendo El Mismo
Juan Torres: Organo Melodico Vol. 20
Little Joe: Nosotros
El Chicano: Cinco
Lucha Villa: Lo Mejor De Jose Alfredo Jimenez
Celia Cruz and Johnny Pacheco: Celia & Johnny
Conjunto Universal: Dando Candela
Raul Marrero: La Nueva Era
Johnny Zamot: Zamot
Pete "El Conde" Rodríguez: El Conde
Eddie Palmieri: Recorded Live At Sing Sing Volume 2
Raphael: Que Diran De Mi
Orquesta Tipica Tropical: Salsa Sí
Ismael Miranda: En Fa Menor
Cheo Feliciano: Looking For Love (Buscando Amor)
Fania All Stars: Latin-Soul-Rock
Elio Roca: Porque Te Quiero, Es Mi Unica Verdad
José Antonio: El "Feeling" Unico
Olguita Alvarez: Cuando Estoy En Tus Brazos
Tito Puente & His Orchestra Tito Unlimited
: Hoguera De Amor
Juan Torres Y Su Organo Melódico: A Borinquen - Vol. 21
Sonora Ponceña: Sabor Sureño
La Conspiracion: Cada Loco Con Su Tema
Roberto Torres & Alfredo "Chocolate" Armenteros: Juntos
Kako: Kako
Willie Colón, Hector Lavoe and Yomo Toro: Asalto Navideño Vol. II
Ismael Quintana: Ismael Quintana
King Clave: Los Hombres No Deben Llorar
Julio Iglesias: A flor de piel
Los Jovenes Del Hierro: Si Tienes Verguenza
Fernando Albuerne: Nosotros
 & Su Combo: Cállese La Boca Compay..!
Antonio Aguilar: A Mi Querido Puerto Rico
: La Esposa Olvidada
Graciela: Esa Soy Yo, Yo Soy Asi
Bobby Valentín: In Motion
Sonia López: Voz, Sentimiento y Amor
Vicente Fernández El Ídolo de Mexico
Rafael Cortijo and Ismael Rivera: Juntos Otra Vez
The Judge's Nephews: Los Sobrinos del Juez
Yolanda Del Rio: Hoy Te Toca Dormir En El Suelo ¡Ay Mama Lo Que Te Dijé!
Latin Breed: Minus One
Los Baby's: Como Sufro
Los Tremendos Gavilanes: Cuando Paso Por Tu Casa
Los Humildes: Un Pobre No Más
Richie Ray and Bobby Cruz: 1975
Camilo Sesto: Camilo
Conjunto Universal: Tremendo Disco
Sandro de America: Sandro... Siempre Sandro
Banda Macho: La Super Banda De Mexico
Tico-Alegre All Stars: Live At Carnegie Hall Vol. 1
Simón Díaz and Hugo Blanco & su Conjunto: Las Gaitas De Simon
Raphael: Raphael Amor Mío
Mocedades: 5
Danny Daniel: Danny Daniel
Larry Harlow: Live In Quad
José Mangual* & Carlos "Patato" Valdez*: Understanding Latin Rhythms Vol. 1
Monguito Santamaria: En Una Nota!
La Sonora Matancera: 50 Años
Ray Rodriguez And Duro: Ray Rodriguez And Duro
Rigo Tovar & Su Costa Azul: Volumen 3 - En La Cumbre
Carlos Guzman: Carlos Guzman
Peñaranda & Su Conjunto: Nuevamente Peñaranda & Su Conjunto
Roberto Carlos: Yo Te Recuerdo
Germaín De La Fuente: El Angel Negro
Estrellita: Quien Te Dijo Que Te Quiero
Marco Antonio Muñiz: Salsa Tropical
Freddy Fender: Before The Next Teardrop Falls
Los Baby's: Un Viejo Amor
Juan Torres: Y Su Organo Melodico Vol. 22
Freddie Martinez: Don Freddie Martinez
Roberto Pulido & Los Clasicos: Da Vinci (Volume 2)
Julio Iglesias: El amor
Tipica Novel: Sabrosa Novel
Los Chavales De España: Los Chavales De España
La Pandilla: La Pandilla
Tambo: Al Santiago Presents Tambo
Freddy Fender: She Thinks I Still Care
Ruben Ramos & The Mexican Revolution: Quiero Una Cita
Mike Laure Y Sus Cometas: Mariposas Locas-Los Borrachitos
Los Kasinos: Triunfadores
Tortilla Factory: Made In America
Juan Gabriel and Vargas de Tecalitlán: Juan Gabriel con el Mariachi Vargas de Tecalitlán
Conjunto Quisqueya: Que Bueno Ta' Este Pais
Sophy: Que Vas A Hacer Sin Mí
Aldo Monges: El Trovador Romantico De Cordoba
Alberto Cortez: Como El Ave Solitaria
Jorge Ben: A Tábua de Esmeralda
Arnaldo Baptista: Lóki?
Cartola: Cartola
Gal Costa: Cantar

Deaths

Births
January 30Charlie Zaa, Colombian bolero singer
March 8Carlos Baute, Venezuelan pop singer
April 18Millie Corretjer, Puerto Rican pop singer
May 16Laura Pausini, Italian pop singer
December 8Cristian Castro, Mexican pop singer

1975

Events
May 17The Recording Academy announces that it will include a new category for Latin music for the following Grammy Awards. This marks the first time that a Grammy Award is presented for Latin music.
November 15Gualberto Castro, representing Mexico, wins the 4th Annual OTI Festival with his song "La felicidad".

Notable singles

Album releases

Eddie Palmieri: Unfinished Masterpiece
Johnny Pacheco: El Maestro
Fania All-Stars: Live At Yankee Stadium Vol. 1
Mongo Santamaría: Afro-Indio
Ray Barretto: Barretto
Willie Colón: The Good, the Bad, the Ugly
Cornelio Reyna: Cornelio Reyna/Cuatro Estrellas en el Cielo
Chayito Valdez: Se Marchó
Felipe Arriaga: El Nuevo Ídolo De La Canción Ranchera
Los Unicos: Siempre! Los Unicos
Los Clasicos de Roberto Pulido: Quien?
Joe Bataan: Afrofilipino
Hector Lavoe: La Voz
Orquesta Aragon: 75
Johnny Ventura & Su Combo: En Accion
El Gran Trio: A Que No Te Atreves
Los Kasinos: Los Kasinos
Vikki Carr: Hoy (Today)
Fania All Stars: Live At Yankee Stadium (Vol. 2)
Sunny & The Sunliners: Los Enamorados
Julio Iglesias: A México
El Gran Combo de Puerto Rico: 7
Little Joe & La Familia: Mañana
José Fajardo: Fajardo & Sus Estrellas Del 75
Morris Albert: Morris Albert En Español
Joe Quijano Y Su Orquesta: Ahora
Conjunto Universal: Super-Power
The Lebron Brothers]]: 4 + 1 = The Lebron Brothers
Angelica Maria: Before The Next Teardrop Falls
King Clave: Mi Corazón Lloro
Vicente Fernández: El Hijo del Pueblo
Anacani: Anacani
Orquesta Broadway: Salvaje
Ismael Rivera: Soy Feliz
Yolanda Del Rio: Se Me Olvidó Otra Vez
Latin Breed: U.S.A.
Sunny & The Sunliners: Carinosamente
Celia Cruz & Johnny Pacheco: Tremendo Caché
Gerardo Reyes: El Rey De Los Caminos
Tipica 73: La Candela
Roberto Carlos: Quiero Verte A Mi Lado
Cornelio Reyna & Su Conjunto: Cuando Escuches Este Vals
The Salsoul Orchestra: Salsoul Orchestra
Grupo Folklorico Y Experimental Nuevayorquino: Concepts in Unity
El Gran Combo de Puerto Rico: El Gran Combo – ¿tu Querias Salsa? ¡Toma Salsa! Con El Gran Combo
Tito Puente: No Hay Mejor (There Is No Better)
Al Santiago Presents Yambú: Yambú
Emilio José: Mi Barca
Justo Betancourt: Lo Sabemos
Rumba Tres: Rumba Tres
José Antonio: Después Del Festival...
Sophy Hernández: Sentimientos, Feelings
Toro: Toro
Larry Harlow: El Judio Maravilloso
Yolandita Monge: Floreciendo!
Rigo Tovar & Su Costa Azul: Crema De Cumbia Con El Costa Azul De Rigo Tovar
Los Humildes: Mas Mas Mas Mas
The Royal Jesters: The Band
Tony de la Rosa: Mi Ultima Parranda
Vicente Fernández: Canta Para Recordar
Luis Santi & Su Conjunto: El Bigote
Alvarez Guedes: Alvarez Guedes 2
Camilo Sesto: Amor Libre
Rafael Cortijo & Su Nuevo Combo: Champions
Los Diablos: Mexico Es
Ismael Miranda: Este Es Ismael Miranda
Freddy Fender: Canta En Español Antes De La Segunda Lagrima
Little Joe & La Familia: Brown Stuff
: A La Edad De 14 Años
Los Kasinos and Cecilio Garza: El Poderoso
Renacimiento 74: Vol. III
Los Terricolas: Una Carta
Bobby Rodriguez & La Compañia: Lead Me to That Beautiful Band
Sandro de America: Tú Me Enloqueces
Marco Antonio Muñiz Tiempo y Destiempo
Los Tigres Del Norte: Contrabando Y Traicion
Los Felinos: Chicanisimo
Orquesta Novel: With a Touch Of Brass
Los Pasteles Verdes: Vol. II
Jimmy Edward Memories (Recuerdos)
Raul Marrero: Apartamento No 2
Bobby Valentín: Va a La Carcel
Iris Chacon: Iris Chacon (1975)
Richie Ray & Bobby Cruz: 10 Aniversario (10th Anniversary)
Los Terricolas: Los Terricolas En Mexico
Los Unicos: Todavia
Carlos Guzman: La Costumbre
Los Alegres De Teran: Los Contrabandistas Sus Corridos y Sus Leyendas
Los Cadetes De Linares: Los Dos Amigos
The Latin Breed: Power Drive
Charlie Palmieri: Impulsos
Markolino Dimond: Beethoven's V
Tipica Novel: Tipicante
El Gran Combo de Puerto Rico: Mejor Que Nunca (Better Than Ever)
Augstin Ramirez: (Si El No Quierre Tu Carino) Damelo
Fania All Stars: Tribute To Tito Rodriguez
Larry Harlow and Ismael Miranda: Con Mi Viejo Amigo
Kako & Azuquita: Union Dinamica
Raphael: Con El Sol De La Mañana'''
Carmen Silva: Que Dios Proteja Nuestro Amor Amor Sin FronterasLos Junior: Le Cantan Al AmorSunny And The Sunliners: SiempreRoberto Carlos: Roberto Carlos (1975)
Alberto Vazquez: Rancheras RománticasLos Humildes]]: Numero 4Roberto Yanes: La Voz RomanticaVitin Aviles: Otra Vez Con AmorTania: InigualableLos Tres Grandes: ReflexionandoRicardo Ceratto: Me Estoy Acostumbrando A TiLos Felinos: Flor Morena Flecha De AmorMocedades: La Otra EspañaJuan Bau: PenasFlaco Jimenez: El Rey De TexasDanny Daniel: Sé Que Me Engañaste Un DíaAngel Canales: SaborElio Roca: Yo Soy....Rita Lee and Tutti Frutti: Fruto ProibidoTim Maia: RacionalGilberto Gil: RefazendaWalter Franco: RevolverRaul Seixas: Novo AeonGilberto Gil and Jorge Ben: Gil e JorgeCaetano Veloso: Qualquer Coisa/JóiaDeaths
Births
May 8Enrique Iglesias, Spanish pop singer

1976
Events
February 28 For the first time in Latin music history, a Grammy Award is presented to the genre. Eddie Palmieri wins the Grammy Award for Best Latin Recording at the 18th Annual Grammy Awards for Sun of Latin Music.
April 17Billboard tracks sales of LP's in Puerto Rico for the first time.
July 31Billboard divides Latin LP's into two separate genres for the first time into "Pop LP's" and "Salsa LP's" for the selected regions of the US. 
October 30María Ostiz, representing Spain, wins the 5th Annual OTI Festival with her song "Canta cigarra ".

Notable singles

Album releases

Ray Barretto Band: Tomorrow: Barretto LiveTito Puente: The LegendEydie Gorme: La GormeFania All-Stars: Salsa (Original Soundtrack)Joe Cuba: Cocinando la SalsaMongo Santamaría: SofritoCarlos Guzman, Mariachi Mexico: El CuatreroCorporacion Latina: Llego' Pa' QuedarseRigo Tovar & Su Costa Azul: Te Quiero DijisteRoberto Torres: De NuevoLos Tigres del Norte: La Banda Del Carro RojoWally González: Tu y Tu C.B.Josue: Buscando EstrellitasSunny & The Sunliners: Yesterday... & SunnyVicente Fernández: A Tu SaludLucía Méndez: Siempre Estoy Pensando En Ti...Bobby Capó: Simplemente... AmorFajardo '76: La Raiz De La Charanga - "Charanga Roots"Charanga 76: Charanga 76Cheo Feliciano: The SingerConjunto Candela: Conjunto CandelaChocolate & Su Orquesta: En El RinconOrquesta Tipica Ideal: Vamonos Pa' Senegal Para Bailar Y GozarRoberto Roena & Su Apollo Sound: Lucky 7Mario Quintero: Nomas ContigoSnowball & Company: Snowball & CoLos Tigres del Norte: Pueblo QueridoTony de la Rosa: Tony De La RosaGilberto Monroig: Salud CariñoJimmy Edward: SoloHéctor Lavoe: De Ti DependeChelo and El Mariachi Oro Y Plata De José Chávez: CheloJulio Iglesias: AmericaCelia Cruz, Johnny Pacheco, Justo Betancourt, and Papo Lucca: Recordando El AyerSuper Tipica de Estrellas: Super Tipica De EstrellasChino Y Su Conjunto Melao: 100% BailableRoberto Carlos: Tu CuerpoCarlos "Patato" Valdes: AuthorityDanny Rivera: Temas De PeliculasWilkins: Wilkins
Wilfrido Vargas & Sus Beduinos: Wilfrido Vargas & Sus BeduinosSonora Ponceña: Musical Conquest (Conquista Musical)Fania All Stars: Delicate And JumpyPuerto Rico All Stars: Puerto Rico All StarsHaciendo Punto En Otro Son: Haciendo Punto En Otro SonKing Clave: Por Culpa TuyaAugustin Ramirez: No.1 Otra VezPete "El Conde" Rodríguez: Este Negro Si Es SabrosoJose Ortiz: Trullando En Puerto RicoEl Gran Trio: X AniversarioSophy: Te Pido Que Te Quedes Esta NocheLos Angeles Negros: DespacitoElio Roca: InternacionalLuis García: Tras El CristalBlanca Rosa Gil: Sigo Siendo ReinaConjunto Universal: Conjunto Universal VIILos Kimbos Con Adalberto Santiago: Los Kimbos Con Adalberto SantiagoLittle Joe: Que Suave Loco!Freddy Fender: Recordando Los '50Tortilla Factory: Andando En La ParrandaRamon Ayala & Los Bravos Del Norte: Dinastia De La MuerteMiguel Gallardo: 2Los Pasteles Verdes: Ruega Por Nosotros - Vol. 4Jose Miguel Class: Tuyo En Vida Y MuerteDanny Rivera: AlboradaLos Terricolas: Un SueñoLuciana: En La Soledad De Mi ApartamentoBeatriz Adriana: Gozar y GozarDiego Verdaguer: VolvereLos Baby's: Morir ContigoLeBrón Brothers: Distinto Y DiferenteJerry Masucci: Salsa GreatsRay Barretto: Tomorrow: Barretto LiveCheo Feliciano: Cheo's RainbowDimension Latina: Dimension Latina En Nueva YorkYolanda del Rio: El Día Que Me Acaricies LloraréJay Garcia And The Crusader Band: Mastedonte B.C.Mon Rivera: Mon Y Sus TrombonesTipica 73: Rumba CalienteRafael Cortijo and Ismael Rivera: La Quiniela Del DiaOlga Guillot: Se Me Olvidó Otra VezLissette: QuieremePerla: ¡Hipocresia!Camilo Sesto: MemoriasLos Melódicos: Marcando El RitmoJuan Gabriel: Juan Gabriel con Mariachi Vol. IIGrupo Miramar: Una Lágrima y Un RecuerdoManolo Muñoz: LlamaradaBobby Rodriguez & La Compañia: Salsa at Woodstock (Recorded Live)Bobby Valentín: AfueraLibre: Con Salsa Con Ritmo, Vol. 1Lucha Villa: No Me Dejes, Nunca, NuncaRaphael: Canta...Antonio Aguilar: Soy InocenteLola Beltrán: Lola "La Grande"Amalia Mendoza: Con MariachiLittle Joe, Johnny Hernandez, and Benny Munoz: Que Suave Loco!Orquesta Broadway: PasaporteWilfrido Vargas & Sus Beduinos: Wilfrido Vargas & Sus BeduinosOrchestra Harlow: El Jardinero del AmorSaoco: Siempre Seré GuajiroRaphy Leavitt & La Selecta Orchestra: De Frente A La Vida..Facing Life...Tito Allen: Feliz Y DichosoRichie Ray & Bobby Cruz: ReconstrucciónCachao: Cachao Y Su Descarga 77 Vol. 1Nelson Ned: Por La Puerta GrandeLos Freddy's: Un Sentimiento`
Dueto Frontera: La Provincia CantaFelipe Rodriguez: La Voz Con Los AntaresClaudia de Colombia: Volumen 7Sociedad 76: Sociedad 76Los Potros: Cantando Llega El AmorLolita Flores: AbrázameCarlos Torres Vila: Carlos Torres VilaJosé María Napoleón: ViveJose Luis Gazcón: La Onda De Jose Luis GazcónHugo Blanco: Bailables No. 11Emir Boscán & Los Tomasinos: 5 CompasElio Roca: Te Necesito Tanto AmorVicente Fernández: ¿Gusta Usted? (Joyas Rancheras Al Estilo De Vicente Fernandez)Rocío Jurado: Amor MarineroGrupo Miramar: Una Lagrima y un RecuerdoLos Angeles Negros: BolerisimoJuan Gabriel: Juan Gabriel con Mariachi Vol. IICartola: CartolaTom Zé: Estudando o Samba'
Elis Regina: Falso Brilhante
Chico Buarque: Meus Caros Amigos
Tim Maia: Tim Maia Racional Vol 2
Jorge Ben: África Brasil
Caetano Veloso, Gal Costa, Gilberto Gil, and Maria Bethânia: Deaths 
August 2Cecilia, Spanish singer-songwriter

Births
January 8Alexandre Pires, Brazilian pop singer and lead singer of Só Pra Contrariar
February 3Daddy Yankee, Puerto Rican reggaeton singer
October 6Yotuel Romero, Cuban rapper and member of Orishas

1977
Events
February 19Eddie Palmieri wins the Grammy Award for Best Latin Recording at the 19th Annual Grammy Awards for Unfinished Masterpiece.
November 12Guayo González, representing Nicaragua, wins the 6th Annual OTI Festival with his song "Quincho Barrilete".

Notable singles

Album releases

Mongo Santamaría: DawnEydie Gormé and Danny Rivera: Muy Amigos (Close Friends)Machito Orchestra with Lalo Rodríguez: FireworksRosenda Bernal: La Nueva LeyChino Y Su Conjunto Melao: Chino Y Su Conjunto MelaoWillie Colón and Ruben Blades: Metiendo ManoBrown Express: Maquina 501Renacimiento 74: ViajandoJohnny Pacheco The ArtistCharanga 76: EncoreRoberto Roena & Su Apollo Sound: La 8va. MaravillaJusto Betancourt: Distinto & DiferenteTito Puente: The LegendCosta Chica: Tapame
Vicente Fernández: La Muerte de un GalleroFania All Stars: Rhythm MachineWillie Colón: El Baquine de Angelitos NegrosRay Barretto: Energy To BurnGerardo Reyes: Ya Vas CarnalYolanda Del Rio: Yolanda Del RioMiguel Gallardo: "Desnudate" Tema CensuradoFelito Felix: El CantautorOscar Solo: Oscar SoloDanny Rivera: Danny RiveraCamilo Sesto: RasgosCharytin: La Dulce CharytinTipica 73: The Two Sides of Tipica 73José Fajardo: El Talento TotalIsmael Miranda: No Voy Al FestivalLos Kimbos: The Big KimbosIsmael Rivera: De Todas Maneras RosasLa Sonora Ponceña: El Gigante del SurLos Tigres del Norte: Vivan Los MojadosGrupo La Cruz: Cumbias, Merequetengues y ZapateadosLa Tropa Chicana: Tu Nuevo CariñitoLos Cadetes de Linares: Cruzando El Puente - De Ramones A Los AlgodonesOscar D'Leon: 2 Sets Con OscarRenacimiento 74: Perdido Para SiempreRoberto Pulido & Los Clasicos: Copa Tras CopaCornelio Reyna: Te Vas Angel MioJimmy Edward: Love SongsMiami Sound Machine: Live Again (Renacer)Mario Echevarria: En Este Momento Y A Estas Horas...Tomas De San Julian: Tomas De San JulianLissette: Justo YoPablo Abraira: 30 De FebreroTommy Olivencia: El Negro ChomboLos Hijos Del Rey: Los Hijos Del ReyEl Gran Combo de Puerto Rico: InternacionalPupi Legarreta and Johnny Pacheco: Los Dos MosqueterosRicardo Marrero and The Group: TimeLittle Joe Y La Familia: La Voz de AztlanJosé José: ReencuentroCharlie Palmieri and Meñique: Con Salsa y SaborCepillin: La Feria de Cepillin Vol. IIRigo Tovar & Su Costa Azul: Dos Tardes De Mi VidaLos Humildes: Besitos, Besitos, BesitosLos Baby's: Regresa YaDimension Latina: Los Generales de la SalsaElio Roca: El Show De Elio RocaLucía Méndez: Frente A FrenteJulio Iglesias: A mis 33 añosNelson Ned: El Romantico De AmericaJosé María Napoleón: HombreGrupo Alpha: Grupo AlphaLos Muecas: Indita QueridaLos Solitarios: Sabor De EngañoCelia Cruz and Willie Colón: Only They Could Have Made This AlbumWilkins  – No Se Puede Morir Por Dentro
Marco Antonio Muñiz: Canta...Para UstedJosé María Napoleón PajarilloRoberto Roena & Su Apollo Sound: 9Yambú: The African QueenRalphy Santi: Ralphy Santi & Su ConjuntoJunior Gonzalez: Tiempos Buenos / Good TimesDyango: Contigo en la DistanciaCheo Feliciano: Mi Tierra y YoRoberto Carlos: 
Rocío Dúrcal: Canta a Juan GabrielDimension Latina 78: 780 Kilos de SalsaRaul Vale: Eres Toda Una MujerRaphael: El CantorJosue: Tengo La Sangre De IndioLucía Méndez: Lucía MéndezOrchestra Harlow: La Raza Latina - A Salsa SuitePete "El Conde" Rodriguez: A Touch of ClassLos Pasteles Verdes: Mi Amor ImposibleBasilio: Demasiado AmorJuan Bau: 5José Velez: RomanticaOlga Guillot: Olga GuillotLos Bukis: Los Alambrados Y Otros ExitosYolanda Del Rio: Tradicionales Al Estilo De Yolanda Del RioJohnny Pacheco and Melón: Llegó MelónTito Allen: Ahora y SiempreConjunto Impacto: Conjunto ImpactoVitin Aviles: Con Mucha SalsaLos Angeles Negros: Serenata Sin LunaCosta Chica: SensacionalLucha Villa: Interpreta a Juan GabrielPunto Sur: Juguete CaroChucho Avellanet: Y Hoy Me Recuerdas...Willy Chirino: EvolucionAlvarez Guedes: 6Mocedades: 8Little Joe y La Familia: CalienteJohnny Ventura & Su Combo: ExcitanteCepillin: Volumen III Vamos A La Escuela/TamborileiroBillo's Caracas Boys: Billo 78Camilo Sesto: Entre AmigosLolita: Mi CartaWilkins: Amarse Un PocoYolandita Monge: Soy Ante Todo MujerArmando Manzanero: Corazón Salvaje (soundtrack)
Danny Rivera: Para Toda La VidaSunny & The Sunliners: Andale Mi AmorJosé Mangual Jr.: Tribute to Chano PozoLos Bravos del Norte de Ramón Ayala: Que Me Lleve El DiabloLos Polifaceticos: Ocho PalabrasYndio: V AniversarioIsmael Rivera and Rafael Cortijo: Llaves De La TradicionLeBrón Brothers: 10th AnniversaryCachao: DosJoan Sebastian: Y Las MariposasConjunto Acapulco Tropical: Noches de Cabaret (soundtrack)
Tony de la Rosa: Dame Una CachetadaDiego Verdaguer: Diego VerdaguerCharanga Chicago: La ChinaJosé Luis Rodríguez: Una Canción De España...Eddie Palmieri: The Music ManGuarare: GuarareBanda Black Rio: Maria FumaçaGilberto Gil: RefavelaJoão Gilberto: AmorosoBest-selling albums
The following is a list of the top 5 best-selling Latin albums of 1977 in the United States divided into the categories of Latin pop and salsa, according to Billboard.

Deaths 

Births
January 14Yandel, Puerto Rican reggaeton singer
January 21Frankie Negrón, American salsa singer
January 22Mario Domm, Mexican pop singer-songwriter, lead member of Camila
February 2Shakira, Colombian pop singer

1978
Events
February 23Mongo Santamaría wins the Grammy Award for Best Latin Recording at the 20th Annual Grammy Awards for Dawn.
December 2, representing Brazil, wins the 7th Annual OTI Festival with her song "El amor...cosa tan rara".

Album releases

Celia Cruz and Johnny Pacheco: EternosWillie Colón and Rubén Blades: SiembraTito Puente: Homenaje a Beny MoréEddie Palmieri: Lucumi, Macumba, VoodooLaurindo Almeida: Laurindo Almeida TrioMongo Santamaría: A La CarteJuan Gabriel: Siempre en Mi MenteDanny Daniel: Nunca Supé La VerdadLos Huracanes del Norte: Son Tus Perjumenes...Mujer!Los Freddy's: Cariñito MaloLos Alvarado: Son Tus Perjumenes MujerRay Conniff: Exitos LatinosJosé José: VolcánSophy: Sophy En ConcietoAlma: Sin Limites....UnlimitedJoe Bravo: Joe Bravo Is BackLos Cadetes De Linares: El Hijo Del PalenqueRoberto Pulido: ...On TourJuan Gabriel: EspectacularRuben Naranjo Y Los Gamblers: FelicidadesOscar D'Leon & Su Salsa Mayor El Oscar De La SalsaFania All Stars: Spanish FeverAdalberto Santiago: AdalbertoLibre: Con Salsa Con Ritmo Vol. 2: Tiene CalidadJusto Betancourt & Su Conjunto Borincuba – ¡Presencia!Saoco: Macho MumbaCharanga '76: Live At RoselandSalvador's: La Voz Del SentimientoLos Tigres Del Norte: Numero OchoNelson Ned: Voz y CorazónGeorge Maysonet and Charanga America: George Maysonet and Charanga AmericaLa Sonora Ponceña: ExplorandoOrquesta Novel: Salud, Dinero Y AmorBobby Rodríguez & La Compañia: Latin From ManhattanRenacimiento 74: Frescas RosasAngel Canales: LiveWilfrido Vargas & Sus Beduinos: Punto Y Aparte!Los Kimbos: Hoy y MañanaLarry Harlow Presents Latin Fever: Latin FeverCharlie Palmieri: The HeavyweightDaniel Magal: Cara De GitanaEl Jefe Y Su Grupo: Te Parto el AlmaEddie Palmieri: ExplorationMon Rivera: ForeverPuerto Rico All-Stars: Los ProfesionalesLupita D'Alessio: Juro Que Nunca VolveréCepillin: En Un Bosque De La China Vol. VConjunto Impacto: Un Documento BailableLissette: SolaMarco Antonio Muñiz: Salsa A La Manera De Marco Antonio MuñizHéctor Lavoe: ComediaVicente Fernández: A Pesar De TodoChelo: La Inspiration De Jose Alfredo Los Cadetes De Linares: Tu NombreBrown Express: Pilares De CristalEl Gran Combo de Puerto Rico: El Gran Combo En Las VegasImpacto Crea – Impacto Crea
Reynaldo Obregon: Sangre De VinoLos Sagitarios: Adios AmorSergio and Estíbaliz: Canciones SudamericanasAlvarez Guedes: 7Augustin Ramirez: El ParranderoIsmael Miranda: Sabor, Sentimiento Y PuebloIsmael Rivera: Esto Si Es Lo MioLouie Ramirez: Louie Ramirez & Sus AmigosTipica 73: Salsa EncendidaOscar D'Leon: Oscar D'Leon & Su Salsa Mayor
Orquesta Broadway: New York City SalsaTommy Olivencia: La PrimerisimaDimension Latina: InconquistableConjunto Tipico Criollo: Conjunto Tipico CriolloCarlos Miranda: Lo Que Esperaba DeDemis Roussos: Demis Roussos En CastellanoGrupo La Amistad: NailaYolanda Del Rio: Yolanda Del RioDimension Latina – ...Tremenda Dimension!
Tipica Ideal: Fuera Del MundoGilberto Monroig: Añoranzas Y QuimeraFederico Villa: Corridos Con Federico VillaJimmy Edward: My Special AlbumRoberto Roena: El ProgresoEl Grupo La Migra: Celos De TiPedrito Fernandez: La De La Mochila AzulCamilo Sesto: SentimientosChelo: ¡Las Cuentas Claras!Veronica Castro: SensacionesJosé José: Lo Pasado, PasadoAlberto Vázquez: Como No Creer...
Estela Nuñez: Con Mariachi Para Toda la VidaPunto Quatro: Version En Español De GreaseLos Terricolas: Los TerricolasTommy Olivencia: Sweat Trumpet...Hot SalsaCelia Cruz and Johnny Pacheco: EternosRocío Dúrcal: Canta A Juan Gabriel Volumen 2Chalo Campos El ChicleroLos Baby's: SabotajeJuan Gabriel – Mis Ojos TristesManolo Muñoz – Siente El MariachiRigo Tovar & Su Costa Azul: Vol. 8Cepillin: Cepillin Night FeverRuben Naranjo Y Los Gamblers: Mis Ojos QuerendonesLos Sagitarios: La CartaJulio Iglesias: EmocionesLos Bukis: Me Siento SoloLolita Flores: EspéramePequeña Compañia: BolerosBobby Valentín: La Boda de EllaRolando Ojeda: SiempreLos Felinos – Los Felinos
La Sonora Ponceña La Orquesta De Mi TierraSaoco Original: CurareOrchestra Harlow: El Albino DivinoLos Bravos del Norte de Ramón Ayala: El Soldado RasoJohnny Ventura: Presentando A...Mi Nueva Cosecha!Jose Domingo Castaño: MotivosRégulo Alcocer Y Su Grupo: Cuando Yo MueraJuan Torres: Superdiscotheque 3Fania All Stars: LiveEddie Palmieri: Lucumi, Macumba, VoodooLa Salsa Mayor: De Frente & LuchandoSanto Morales: Boleros, Con AmorBraulio: Vivir SintiendoPablo Abraira: VisionesElio Roca: Elio RocaSophy: Balada Para un LocoRamón Ayala & Los Bravos Del Norte: Mi Piquito De OroIrene Rivas – Irene Rivas
Rocío Jurado: De Ahora en AdelanteLa Lupe: Apasionada (Passionate)Oscar D'Leon: La CriticaMazz: MazzRoberto Pulido: Seguiré Mi CaminoVictor Yturbe: De Vez En Vez...Roberto Carlos: Roberto Carlos '78Luis "Perico" Ortiz: Super SalsaOrquesta Aragon: Ritmo Cha-OndaElio Pacheco: African FireRay Barretto: GraciasMachito: Mucho MachoChayito Valdéz: Chayito ValdézJuan Gabriel: Canta A Juan GabrielSonora Dinamita: Sonora DinamitaLos Potros: Los PotrosChelo: Mas José Alfredo En La Voz De... CheloLos Bukis: Los BukisLos 8 De Colombia: Piensa CorazónVicente Fernández: Mi Amigo El TordilloDanny Rivera: SerenataLeonardo Paniagua: Leonardo PaniaguaJosé Vélez: SeguimosAdalberto Santiago: Featuring Popeye El MarinoRoberto Torres: Presenta A Su Amigo PapaitoBest-selling albums
The following is a list of the top 5 best-selling Latin albums of 1978 in the United States divided into the categories of Latin pop and salsa, according to Billboard.

Deaths 

Births
February 10Don Omar, Puerto Rican reggaeton singer
February 23Residente, Puerto Rican rapper
April 15Luis Fonsi, Puerto Rican pop singer
September 30Juan Magán, Spanish DJ
December 19Wisin, Puerto Rican reggaeton singer

1979
Events
February 28Tito Puente wins the Grammy Award for Best Latin Recording at the 21st Annual Grammy Awards for Homenaje a Beny Moré .
December 8Daniel Riolobo, representing Argentina, wins the 8th Annual OTI Festival with his song "Cuenta conmigo".

Album releases

Irakere: IrakereFania All-Stars: Cross OverAirto Moreira: Touching You, Touching MeLos Cadetes de Linares: Pescadores de EnsenadaLos Tigres del Norte: El TahurLos Humildes:Los Humildes En MexicoTito Allen: UntouchableJoe Cuba: El Pirata del CaribeJose Mangual Jr. Pa' Bailar Y GozarYolanda Del Rio: Los Tiene de AdornoMongo Santamaria: Red HotWillie Bobo: BoboJohnny Pacheco and Hector Casanova: Los AmigosIsmael Quintana and Ricardo Marrero: JessicaPoncho Sanchez: PonchoRoberto Jordan: El Sol Se FueWilly Chirino: ... Come Into My MusicAngela Carrasco: Angela CarrascoFito Giron: Fiebre De Fito GironLupita D'Alessio: Solo Soy una MujerEstela Nuñez: Por Amores Como TúJulio Iglesias: Todos Los Días, Un Día (soundtrack)
Los Humildes: En MexicoRoberto Torres: El Duro del GuaguancoOscar de Fontana: Nuestros BolerosOscar D' León & Su Orquesta: El Más GrandeCelia Cruz and La Sonora Ponceña: La CeibaWillie Colón: SoloLos Virtuosos: ArrollandoPuerto Rico All Stars: Tribute To The MessiahDimension Latina: Combinacion Latina No.4Angel Canales: El Sentimiento Del Latino En Nueva YorkMarvin Santiago: Fuego a la JicoteaFania All Stars: Cross OverOrquesta Novel: Canta y EncantaLos Hijos del Rey: New LifeTipica 73: En CubaOrchestra Harlow: RumbambolaOrquesta La Terrifica: Orquesta La TerrificaSociedad 76: Sociedad '76Roberto Pulido & Los Clasicos: El PrimoWally González: Las Mujeres y Las NovelasRigo Tovar: Con El MariachiEsteban Jordan: AhoritaNelson Ned: Mi Manera de AmarGilberto Monroig: Interpreta A Bobby CapoJosé María Napoleón: NapoleonVicente Fernández: El TahurLouie Ramirez: Salsa ProgresivaJulio Castro & Orquesta La Masacre: New Generation PresentaAndy Montañez and Pellín Rodríguez: Encuentro Cercano De Dos GrandesEladio Jimenez: Eladio JimenezPupi Legarreta: El FugitivoWilfrido Vargas: Poder MusicalJohnny Pacheco and Daniel Santos Los DistinguidosJoan Sebastian: Hasta Que AmanezcaLos Freddy's: Los Freddy'sLos Felinos: Morena Tenias Que SerLos Bravos del Norte de Ramón Ayala: Puñalada TraperaManoella Torres: Que Me Perdone Tu SeñoraJosé Luís Rodríguez: Por Si VolvierasPete "El Conde" Rodriguez: Soy La LeyYambú: Introducing Jesus NolascoRoberto Torres: Presenta... La Charanga CasinoWillie Rosario: El Rey del RitmoTata Vasquez And His Orchestra: EcstasyPedrito Fernández: Pedrito FernándezEmmanuel: Al Final...Sophy: En MexicoElio Roca: En MexicoRoberto Anglero: Tierra NegraJosé Augusto  – Jose Augusto
Roberto Torres: Roberto Torres Presenta A Su Amigo PapaitoHector Lavoe, Yomo Toro, and Daniel Santos – Feliz NavidadChelo: Ya Me VoyChayito Valdez: La Triunfadora Del Primer Festival de la CanciónRenacimiento 74: Aaaapa ViajecitoLos Tam Y Tex: Plegaria PetroleraRamón Ayala y Los Bravos Del Norte: Bailamos TiaJohnny Ventura En Su Décimoquinto AniversarioCamilo Sesto: Horas De AmorAnthony Rios: VivenciasEladio Romero Santos: La ViudaEl Gran Combo de Puerto Rico: ¡Aquí No Se Sienta Nadie!Oscar D'León & Su Orquesta: ...Llegó...Actuó...Y...Triunfó..!Tito Puente: Homenaje A Beny Vol. 2Rigo Tovar: El RecadoManoella Torres: Se Te Fue Viva La PalomaCaetano Veloso: Cinema TranscendentalAngela Ro Ro: Angela Ro RoBest-selling albums
The following is a list of the top 5 best-selling Latin albums of 1979 in the United States divided into the categories of Latin pop and salsa, according to Billboard.

Deaths 

Births
June 5David Bisbal, Spanish pop singer
October 15Jaci Velasquez, American performer of Christian and Latin pop music

References
GeneralBillboard Latin LP's charts - Issues dated December 9, 1972 – May 31, 1980 
Print editions of the Notitas Musicales'' magazine for the #1 songs in Mexico.
 (#1 songs in Spain)

Further reading

 
1970s in music